Klaus Kreuzeder (4 April 1950 in Forchheim, West Germany – 3 November 2014 in Munich, Germany) was a German saxophonist.

Life 
Klaus Kreuzeder was born in Forchheim, West Germany in 1950 and grew up in Altdorf near Nuremberg. Since contracting Polio at the age of one and a half years, he was reliant on a wheelchair for all of his life, thus also performing live onstage in a wheelchair.

Kreuzeder had a professional music career for more than 30 years. In 1971, he appeared live with the band Ex Ovo Pro at the Free Open Air Festival Hoehn. He went on to become a member of the Jazz Rock band Aera, with whom he performed as a professional musician from 1973 through 1982, also acting as booking agent and de facto band leader. When Aera disbanded, Kreuzeder suddenly found himself "stranded" and faced with massive debt and financial liabilities as high as 70,000 Deutsche Mark. In the below referenced documentary he explained that his physical disability left him with a very small number of options as to finding a conventional day job, which is why he ultimately decided to make a living as a musician performing in public places and inner city shopping areas (busking). He was joined by guitarist Willi Herzinger and the two rose to some local fame with their street bound performances, which audiences said to be of the highest musical caliber. In 1984 Kreuzeder played four concerts joining Stevie Wonder on stage.

1985 marks the making of the first documentary for movie theaters "Grand Slam" (rated "highly valuable" by critics) and the beginning of a collaboration with Eberhard Schoener for ARD-Klassik-Rocknacht. In the same year, music producer Steve Leistner added Kreuzeder to his roster of artists and begins producing "Sax as Sax Can"'s first CD. In 1986, Kreuzeder received the "Kulturpreis" award of the city of Munich and in that same year Bayerischer Rundfunk produced a 45 minute TV documentary titled "Diesseits von Eden". In 1987 Kreuzeder shared the stage with Stevie Wonder, David Sanborn, Jack Bruce, Gianna Nannini and Sting. The "Sax as Sax Can" CD was published that year, followed by many live performances of the duo. In 1988, Kreuzeder was joined by guitarist Henry Sincigno and after some 50 live concerts the two begin producing their sophomore CD "Saxappeal", which was published in 1990 followed by numerous live and TV performances thus establishing the two-piece act as a household name in the music industry. Kreuzeder also shared the stage with artists like Konstantin Wecker, Bill Withers and Al Di Meola.

In 1999, Leistner's music label Trick Music released a "Best of Kreuzeder" album. As a proponent of the burgeoning inclusion movement in Germany, Kreuzeder performed six concerts at the Paralympics in Atlanta in 2000.

In 2002 Klaus Kreuzeder became a member of the Miroslav Nemec band and often appeared with them year round. Notable performances included a concert at Bellevue Palace (Germany) for the German Federal President. Band leader Nemec had risen to popularity due to his part as detective chief superintendent "Ivo Batic" in the German TV crime series Tatort. The two had also become personal friends in addition to performing together.

The progression of Post-polio syndrome symptoms and additionally having contracted cancer resulted in several near fatal collapses of his system. His deteriorating condition forced him to terminate his career as a professional musician in 2013. Kreuzeder had continued to author his autobiography and a DVD until his death. Both works were due for publication in 2015.

Awards 
 1986 Kulturpreis der Stadt Muenchen
 1998 Oberbayerischer Kulturpreis
 2007 Life Award für Menschen mit einem Handicap in der Kategorie Lebenswerk
 2009 Schwabinger Kunstpreis
 2010 Kulturpreis der Bayerischen Landesstiftung

Literature 
 Klaus Kreuzeder Glück gehabt. Autobiografie. München (Langen Müller) 2010

References

External links 
 Klaus Kreuzeder official webpage
 Videos
 

1950 births
2014 deaths
German saxophonists
Male saxophonists
20th-century saxophonists
20th-century German male musicians
People from Forchheim
20th-century German musicians